Timothy Dwight Morris, commonly known as simply Dwight Morris was an American colonel who commanded the 14th Connecticut Infantry Regiment during the American Civil War as well as commanding the 2nd Brigade of the 2nd Corps during the Battle of Antietam.

Biography

Earlier years
Dwight was born on November 22, 1817, at South Farm, Connecticut as the son of James Morris III who was a veteran of the American Revolutionary War. Morris would graduate from Union College in 1832 and would be a Judge of Probate in his district in 1845 until 1851. He would later be a member of the Connecticut State Legislature and served three different terms. In 1850 and in 1860, Morris would travel to Europe and Asia as he traveled to places like Jerusalem, Greece, Russia and Turkey as well as travelling to Africa in the Nile River region.

American Civil War
By the time Morris returned, the War Department would accept an additional regiment for Connecticut on May 21, 1861, and Dwight Morris was chosen to assemble the regiment at Hartford, Connecticut. On May 25, 1862, Morris was appointed as the commander of the 2nd brigade of the 3rd Division of the Army of the Potomac which he would go on to command them at the Battle of Antietam. During the battle itself, his brigade would relieve Colonel Max Weber's Brigade at Sunken Road and took positions at the northern parts of Bloody Lane and the 14th Connecticut was sent to relieve Israel B. Richardson’s Division. After Antietam, Morris would be involved in several skirmishes until he was honorably discharged on October 23, 1863, for disability.

Later years
After his discharge, Morris was appointed as a U.S. Consul of Le Havre, France in 1864 and when he returned, Morris settled down in Bridgeport, Connecticut where he remained until his death on September 26, 1894.

References

1817 births
1894 deaths
Union Army colonels
People from Litchfield County, Connecticut
People of Connecticut in the American Civil War